Batau FC was a South African football (soccer) club based in Ermelo, Mpumalanga.

They were relegated from the 2010–11 National First Division (NFD). In August 2011, they failed in an attempt to purchase the shares of NFD team United FC. Subsequently they won the 2011–12 SAFA Second Division Mpumalanga, but failed to make it out of the playoffs.

References

External links 
Batau FC Official Website
NFD Club Info

Association football clubs established in 2006
Former SAFA Second Division clubs
Soccer clubs in Mpumalanga
2006 establishments in South Africa
Batau F.C.
Defunct soccer clubs in South Africa